Opoku Frefre was a general in the army of the Ashanti Empire in the early 19th century.

Opoku Frefre was initially a slave but he rose to have a large amount of wealth. He also held the office of Gyaasewahene. He was able to convince Osei Bonsu to make the office of Gyaasewahene able to be inherited by his sons, while such offices had traditionally in Ghana only been inheritable by the sons of the holders' sisters.

In 1811 Opoku Frefre led the Ashanti Army in restoring the rule of the Ashanti Empire over Akyem Abuakwa.

References

Ashanti people